Jeanne-Henriette Tirman (9 July 1875, in Charleville-Mézieres (Ardenne) – 30 October 1952, in Sèvres (Hauts-de-Seine))  was a French woman painter and printmaker.

Biography 

Henriette Tirman was a Post-Impressionist painter, printmaker and illustrator with an association with figures of the Bloomsbury Group.

She was the daughter of doctor Charles-Louis-Henry Tirman and  Berte Hanonet de La Grange and also the niece of Senator Louis Tirman (1837–1899). She lived in the family of her brother,  Councillor of State Alexandre-Louis-Albert Tirman (1868-1939) in Paris, 22 rue de l'Yvette.

Her art was influenced by Cézanne. She painted in a manner that respected Cézanne's ideas of logical composition, simple tonality, solidity of volume, and distinct separation of planes. While Matisse represented the reflective and rationalized aspects in the group, Tirman embodied a more spontaneous and instinctive style.

The painter exhibited at the Salon de Champs-Élysées starting in 1897.
In 1900 she had participated at the Exposition Universelle of Paris. 
Since 1906 to 1951 she exhibited her paintings at the Salon d'Automne and at the Salon Société Nationale des Beaux-Arts

Since 1907 exhibited at the Salon des Indépendants where her paintings were put together with those of Henri Matisse, René Schützenberger, Maurice de Vlaminck, Robert Delaunay, Othon Friesz, Wassily Kandinsky, Paul Signac, Georges Braque, Raoul Dufy, Henri Manguin, Georges Braque, Louis Valtat, Charles Camoin, Albert Marquet, Félix Vallotton and other artists.

In 1915 she participated at the Exhibition of French and Belgian Art Panama–Pacific International Exposition. In 1919 she was working on illustrations of La Gerbe periodical in Woodcut technique together with Paul Signac, Henri Ottmann and other painters. In 1920, Tirman exhibited at the Gallery Marcel Bernheim together with Henri Manguin, Henri Ottmann and others.

Since 1920s Henriette Tirman exhibited at the annual Salon des Tuileries in Paris.

In 1933 she took part in Salon de Echanges. At the same time, in accompany with her friend Sonia Lewitska (1880-1937),  she helps André Fau and Francis Thieck in room decoration suggesting services of painters from her closest circle: Raoul Dufy, André Lhote, André Hellé and Jean Marchand. Thereby she supported her friends in tough times of economic crisis in the country.

Also as Othon Friesz she was part of group of artists called Artistes de ce Temps and exhibited at the Petit Palais in 1935.

In 1937, Henriette Tirman with friends creates in her house (Paris, 22 rue de l'Yvette) the Society of Friends Sonia Lewitska, which organized in 1938 two retrospective exhibitions of the artist in the Gallery Sagot - Le Garrec.

After decease of her brother in 1939 she moves to Sèvres (Seine-et-Oise), to madam Berthe-Marie Cazin wife of ceramist Jean-Michel Cazin and lives in her house at 30 avenue de Bellevue.

She was rewarded with the rank of Officier d'Academie.

Illustrations 
 La Bhagavadgìta
 Bodhicaryavatara
 Shantideva, La Marche à la lumière
 Rudyard Kipling, Lettres du Japon (design of pages)
 Sainte-Beuve, Portraits de femmes
 Jean Cocteau, Bertrand Guégan (1892-1943); L'almanach de Cocagne pour l'an 1920-1922, Dédié aux vrais Gourmands Et aux Francs Buveurs (1921)
 La Gerbe (Nantes), periodical.

References

Notes 
 Bénézit, 1976 : Tirman ou Tirmon (Jeanne Henriette)

External links 
 "Works by Henriette Tirman (1875-1952)", Pictify
 Collection de dessins du 19e siècle, atelier Henriette Tirman, atelier Maurice Lang. Bibliotheque Kandinsky, Centre de documentation et de recherché du Musée national d'art moderne - Centre Pompidou
   Le Petit Parisien (Paris) - evening daily newspaper; Salons 1920-1940; 
 Catalogue de luxe of the Department of Fine Arts, Panama-Pacific International Exposition (1915) p.150, (n°509), archive.org
 Benezit Dictionary of Artists, 2006, site Oxford Index (subscription or library membership required)
 Petit Parisien (Paris); 1920, P.2, Salons et Expositions BNF
 Le Temps, 1930, Le Salon d'Automne p.4, Sale XVII BNF
  Comoedia (Paris), 1935-04-11, Une exposition qui nous oblige à méditer sur le cubisme éternel; BNF

1875 births
1952 deaths
19th-century French painters
20th-century French painters
Landscape artists
French still life painters
Symbolist artists
School of Paris
Post-impressionist painters
Modern painters
Modern printmakers
Woodcut designers
French illustrators
French women illustrators
French women painters
Académie Julian alumni
Fauvism
Officiers of the Ordre des Palmes Académiques
19th-century French women artists
20th-century French women artists
20th-century French printmakers
Women graphic designers
French women printmakers